Huzzah is an unincorporated community in eastern Crawford County, Missouri, United States.

A post office called Huzzah was established in 1898, and remained in operation until 1967. The community takes its name from nearby Huzzah Creek.

References

Unincorporated communities in Crawford County, Missouri
Unincorporated communities in Missouri